Fana Vincent "Fidel" Mlombo is a South African politician and trade unionist who has represented the African National Congress (ANC) in the Mpumalanga Provincial Legislature since August 2016. He was formerly the Provincial Secretary of the Mpumalanga branch of the Congress of South African Trade Unions (COSATU) from 2009 to 2016, and he has also served in the provincial executive of the South African Communist Party (SACP).

Trade union career 
Mlombo entered politics in 1985 when he joined COSATU. He was active in the Paper, Printing, Wood, and Allied Workers' Union while working at a Sappi plant in Ngodwana, but he moved to the South African Commercial, Catering and Allied Workers Union in 1995 to become a provincial organiser for the union. In 2002, he joined COSATU as a provincial organiser. He was elected Provincial Secretary of COSATU Mpumalanga in 2009 and he remained in that position when he joined the provincial legislature in August 2016. At that time he was also a member of the Provincial Executive Committee of the SACP in Mpumalanga.

Legislative career 
In the legislature, Mlombo filled a casual vacancy that had arisen after the 2016 local government elections when Nomsa Mtsweni resigned to become Mayor of Thembisile Hani. He was sworn in on 15 August 2016. In the 2019 general election, he was elected to his first full term in the provincial legislature, ranked 13th on the ANC's provincial party list. As of 2022, he was the Majority Chief Whip in the provincial legislature, with Million Makaringe as his deputy.

References

External links 
 

Living people
Year of birth missing (living people)
Members of the Mpumalanga Provincial Legislature
African National Congress politicians
21st-century South African politicians
Members of the South African Communist Party